Cara Black and Rennae Stubbs were the defending champions, but lost in the first round to Elena Dementieva and Flavia Pennetta.

Daniela Hantuchová and Anastasia Myskina won the title by defeating Květa Peschke and Francesca Schiavone 6–0, 3–6, 7–5 in the final.

Seeds

Draw

Draw

References

External links
 Official results archive (ITF)
 Official results archive (WTA)

2006 Doubles
Porsche Tennis Grand Prix - Doubles